Frederick Martin may refer to:
Frederick S. Martin (1794–1865), U.S. Representative from New York
Frederick Martin (editor) (1830–1883), German-born, British statistician, founder of The Statesman's Yearbook
Frederick Martin (cricketer) (1861–1921), English cricketer
Frederick Martin (footballer) (died 1932), English footballer
Frederick Townsend Martin (1849–1914), New York City writer and advocate for the poor
Frederick Martin (politician) (1882–1950), Scottish Liberal, later Labour politician and journalist
Frederick Martin (general) (1882–1954), American aviation pioneer and WWII general
Fred Martin (baseball) (1915–1979), baseball player
Fred Martin (artist) (1927–2022), American artist
Fred Martin (footballer, born 1929) (1929–2013), Scottish footballer
Fred Martin (footballer, born 1907) (1907–1978), English footballer
Fred Martin (sprinter) (born 1966), Australian former sprinter
Fred Martin (politician), Republican Idaho state senator
Freddie Martin (footballer) (1925–1969), English footballer
Freddy Martin (1906–1983), American saxophonist
Fred Martin, a character in the film Albuquerque